Arbabi (also Romanized as Ārbābī) is a village in Qorqori Rural District, Qorqori District, Hirmand County, Sistan and Baluchestan Province, Iran. At the 2006 census, its population was 30, in 5 families.

References 

Populated places in Hirmand County